The Shining is the fourth album by Long Beach, California rapper RBX.

Track listing

Sources
[ AllMusic link]
Discogs link

RBX albums
G-funk albums
2005 albums